Peace FM (Ghana) Peace FM is a private radio station in the Greater Accra Region of Ghana. It is owned and run by the Despite Group of Companies, headed by Osei Kwame. It broadcasts in the Twi language. It was established on 25 May 1999 and It covers local  news, politics, business, entertainment and other issues in Ghana

Notable personalities
Kwami Sefa Kayi
George Abanga
Faada Dickson
Miliky MiCool
Isaac Kaledzi
Dan Kwaku Yeboah
Odi Ahenkan Kwame Yeboah

Programs and events 

Peace FM is known for its political, economic and african culture talks and shows. The station broadcasts in the Twi, a predominant local language.

References

External links 
 Official website
 Online Streaming

Radio stations in Ghana
Internet properties established in 1999
Ghanaian companies established in 1999